Gil Won-ok (born 1928), also known as Grandma Gil, is an activist and former Korean comfort woman who has dedicated her life to demanding redress and an official apology from Japan for the military sexual violence that affected over 200,000 women during World War II.

Early life 
Gil Won-ok was born in 1928 in Pyongyang, North Korea. In 1940, at the age of thirteen, Gil Won-ok boarded a train to a Japanese factory where she was promised work. Instead of being taken to a factory, Gil Won-ok was taken to Harbin, Manchuria, and brought to a comfort station in the winter of 1940 where she was repeatedly sexually assaulted by Japanese soldiers from the ages of thirteen to eighteen years old. During the years Gil Won-ok spent as a victim of military sexual slavery, she contracted syphilis, which formed tumors in her body, leading to four surgeries. Due to complications, doctors gave Gil Won-ok a hysterectomy which left her sterile. After the war, Gil Won-ok tried to go back home to North Korea, but when she got to the border, it was closed. Gil Won-ok to this day still has been unable to return to her home.

In 1998, Gil Won-ok followed the lead of previous comfort women and publicly came out with the sexual violence that was forcefully inflicted upon her for five years of her life. After coming out with the sexual violence that was forced upon her, Gil Won-ok became an activist, advocating for an official apology from Japan for the crimes they committed during World War II. Even though Gil Won-ok was unable to physically have children, she adopted a son after he was left at a gambling house where she worked. He is now a minister. Gil Won-ok currently lives in a home run by The Korean Council for the Women Drafted for Military Sexual Slavery by Japan called Our Peaceful House, where she resides with other comfort women.

Activist Work 
After Gil Won-ok publicly came out with the violent crimes that were inflicted upon her by the Japanese Imperial Army, she vowed to dedicate the rest of her life to demanding an official apology from Japan, as they have failed to take accountability for the crimes that were committed during World War II. Every Wednesday, Gil Won-ok participates in the Wednesday Demonstrations, which have been going on since January 8, 1992, in front of the Japanese Embassy in Korea as an act of protest. Along with participating in the Wednesday Demonstrations, Gil Won-ok travels the world speaking at various location such as the Japanese Women's University, sharing her story while also advocating for an official apology from Japan. Gil Won-ok also participated in the 100 Million Petition Campaign, where the goal was to gather 100 million signatures demanding redress for comfort women. In 2014, Gil Won-ok traveled to Geneva, Switzerland where she delivered 1.5 million signatures to the office of the high commissioner of human rights at The United Nations.

The Butterfly Fund 
In 2012, Gil Won-ok and another former comfort woman, Kim Bok-dong, started The Butterfly Fund with the help of The Korean Council for the Women Drafted for Military Sexual Slavery by Japan as a way to help victims of sexual war crimes around the world. Both women vowed to donate all the funds they have received as compensation for the war crimes that were inflicted on them in order to help women who have been put in similar situations to that of them. Some of the individuals who have been recipients of the fund include victims of the Second Congo War along with rape victims from the Vietnam War whose violence was inflicted on by Koreans.

The Apology 
The 2016 film The Apology, directed by Tiffany Hsiung, follows three former comfort women who bring to light their personal experiences spent as victims of wartime sexual slavery, while also with focusing on the ways in which they are demanding an official apology from Japan. The film focuses on Gil Won-ok's personal experience during her time spent as a comfort woman, while also following her through her various travels as an activist. In the film, Gil Won-ok travels to the Japanese Women's University, China, and lastly Switzerland where she presented the United Nations 1.5 million signatures demanding redress to the 200,000 women who were victims of wartime sexual slavery.

References 

1928 births
Living people
Comfort women
South Korean activists